Love What Survives is the third studio album by British electronic music duo Mount Kimbie, released on Warp on 8 September 2017.

Background
Artwork for the album is by Frank Lebon, who also directed the official videos for "Marilyn" (featuring Micachu), "We Go Home Together" (featuring James Blake) and "Delta". They teased the album for several months before officially revealing the details, such as the title and release date. "Blue Train Lines" is the third single from the album, after "We Go Home Together" and "Marilyn". It features eleven songs.

Critical reception

The album has received strongly positive reviews on release; DIY gave the album a 4/5 review, describing it as "the most affecting work to date by some stretch", and Mixmag called the album "searingly brilliant" and rated it 8/10. Pitchfork rated the album 8.4/10, selecting it as their "Best New Music".

At Metacritic, which assigns a normalized rating out of 100 to reviews from mainstream publications, Love What Survives received an average score of 82, based on 25 reviews, indicating "universal acclaim".

Accolades

Track listing

Charts

References

2017 albums
Warp (record label) albums
Mount Kimbie albums